Chiranjeevulu (lit. "Immortals") is a 2001 Telugu action drama film directed by Radha Krishna in his debut starring Ravi Teja, Sanghavi, Sivaji, Brahmaji, and Shiju. The title is based on the 1956 Telugu film of the same name starring N. T. Rama Rao and Jamuna.The film was remake Of Tamil film Putham Pudhu Payanam (1991).

Plot

Charan, Kiran, Giri and Chanti are best friends. Charan and Kiran are orphans, while Giri and Chanti, who are being treated at a hospital, are diagnosed with a terminal diseases.

One day, at the home of the hospital nurse Sudha, they witness that a local MLA and his brother are misbehaving with her. In saving her, they accidentally kill him and, fearing that the police may not buy their story, flee to an unknown village as fugitives. There they get embroiled in the rivalry between the village president Satyamurthy and the late erstwhile president Nagendra, when they fail to save Nagendra's son Rajan from Satyamurthy's henchmen. Satyamurthy learns of the arrival of the four city boys in the village who had intervened in the killing of Rajan. He calls for a Panchayat meeting and demands them to be thrown out of the village since no one knows about their whereabouts. But Nagendra's widow Devi intervenes and adopts these boys as her sons in front of the whole village as she had witnessed them trying to save Rajan.

Devi tells them about the rivalry between the two presidents. Nagendra was an honest and just president who was loved by the village folks. This had made Satyamurthy jealous, and hence he tries to tarnish his image by bringing about the theft of the jewelry from the village temple by his servant. But Nagendra foils his plan by exposing the servant in front of the Panchayat. Though he is convinced that Satyamurthy perpetrated this theft, he is not able to prove it.

Later, Nagendra's daughter Radha confesses to her father that she and Satyamurthy's son Anand are in love with each other. Keeping aside their enmity, Nagendra decided to support their love and puts forth the proposal of their marriage before Satyamurthy. Satyamurthy, on the other hand, sees this as a brilliant opportunity to have a comeuppance on Nagendra. He agrees to this proposal on one condition that Nagendra should step down from the village president's elections, thus making him the lone candidate and a sure shot winner. Nagendra is enraged with Satyamurthy's motives and vows to marry Radha and Anand by spurning his nefarious plan. Eventually, Satyamurthy gets Nagendra killed by a snake and makes it look like an accident.

Hearing Devi's story, the four boys vow to get her justice by avenging Nagendra's death. Meanwhile, Charan also falls in love with a local village girl named Kaveri.

One day, Satyamurthy witnesses Anand and Radha romancing in the field. Enraged, he tries to get Radha raped by his men while tying Anand. But Charan and his friends manage to save Radha. Kaveri, later on, learns about the truth of the four boys, but decides to keep it to herself. Later, Charan and his friends overhear about Satyamurthy's deal with some international smugglers about illegally selling the village temple's jewelry. But Satyamurthy senses there presence and sends his men after them, and manages to get them trapped in a quicksand. Leaving them to die, he hatches another plot of stealing the temple jewelry and framing Charan and his friends for the theft. But Charan and his friends are saved in time by Kaveri and an inspector who had come to the village to arrest them after knowing about their whereabouts. Charan requests the inspector to give him some time in order to prevent the theft, after which he assures that they all will surrender to him. The inspector agrees.

They eventually manage to prevent the theft and catch Satyamurthy and the smugglers red-handed in the crime. They expose Satyamurthy in front of the Panchayat of all his crimes and also get Radha and Anand married in front of the village. Enraged by his defeat, Satyamurthy wields a blatant attack on the village by his men. Charan finally kills Satyamurthy with the same snake attack, the latter used on Nagendra, thereby avenging Nagendra's death. Giri and Chanti, although they are killed trying to save Radha and Anand.

The film ends with Charan and Kiran surrendering to the inspector and leaving for the city, with a voiceover stating that by their deeds, Charan and his friends have made themselves chiranjeevulu (meaning ‘immortals’).

Cast

Production
The film was to be produced earlier by Divya Jyoti Banners, but owing to financial issues, they abandoned the project. Veteran producer, Raghava, then revived the project as he liked the subject of the film.

Music
The songs for this film were composed by A. B. Murali with lyrics penned by Siva Ganesh.

Track listing

Reception

Kalyan Achanta of fullhyd.com gave it a rating of 3.0 calling it "nearly a remake" of Sholay.

External links

References

2001 films
2000s Telugu-language films
Indian action drama films
2001 directorial debut films
2001 action drama films